Målselv Church is a parish church of the Church of Norway in Målselv Municipality in Troms og Finnmark county, Norway. It is the main church for the Målselv parish which is part of the Senja prosti (deanery) in the Diocese of Nord-Hålogaland. The white concrete and red brick church was built in a long church style in 1978 by the architect Harry Gangvik. The church seats about 360 people.

History
The first church in Målselv was built in 1829. It was a red, wooden, octagonal building. It looked a lot like the Grytten Church that still exists. By the late 1800s, the church was too small for the parish, so it was decided to build a new church. The new, white, wooden church was built in a long church style in 1883 by the architect Håkon Mosling from Steinkjer. The church was consecrated on 11 July 1883 by the Bishop Jacob Sverdrup Smitt. The new church was much larger, seating about 800 people. On 29 June 1972, the church was struck by lightning and it burned down. It took six years to clear the area, make plans, raise money, and rebuild the 3rd Målselv Church. The new concrete and brick church was built in a more modern style. It was consecrated on 19 March 1978.

Media gallery

See also
List of churches in Nord-Hålogaland

References

Målselv
Churches in Troms
20th-century Church of Norway church buildings
Churches completed in 1978
1829 establishments in Norway
Long churches in Norway
Brick churches in Norway